Hiram Henry Cornwell (sometimes known as Cornwall; November 23, 1828 – July 9, 1916) was a member of the Wisconsin State Assembly.

Cornwell was born on November 23, 1828. Sources have differed on the exact location. Cornwell later resided in Verona, Wisconsin. He died on July 9, 1916, in Edgeley, North Dakota.

Assembly career
Cornwell was a member of the Assembly during the 1873 session. He was a Republican.

References

External links

People from Verona, Wisconsin
People from LaMoure County, North Dakota
Republican Party members of the Wisconsin State Assembly
1828 births
1916 deaths
19th-century American politicians